The following is a list of titles of works taken from Shakespearean phrases. It is organized by type of work. Note that this is not the place to list film or television adaptations of Shakespeare's plays; the List of William Shakespeare screen adaptations exists for that purpose.

Antony and Cleopatra 

 Perhaps from "Then must thou needs find out new heaven, new Earth" (I.i – but cf. also Revelation 21):
New Heaven, New Earth: The Visionary Experience in Literature by Joyce Carol Oates
An Inch of Fortune by Simon Raven (I.ii)
 From "My salad days / When I was green in judgment" (I.v):
 See Salad Days (disambiguation)
Her Infinite Variety by Louis Auchincloss (II.ii)
Music Ho! by Constant Lambert (II.v)
Beds in the East by Anthony Burgess (II.vi)
Gaudy Night by Dorothy L. Sayers (III.xiii)
Make Death Love Me by Ruth Rendell (III.xiii)
The Secret House of Death by Ruth Rendell (IV.xv)

As You Like It 

From the title:
See As You Like It (disambiguation)
 From the "All the world's a stage" monologue (II.vii):
All the World's a Stage, 1976 album by Rush
"All the World's a Stage", 2010 Ugly Betty episode
All the World's a Stooge, 1941 short by The Three Stooges
"... And All the Stars a Stage", 1960 short story by James Blish
All the World's a Grave: A New Play by William Shakespeare, 2008 play by John Reed
The Seven Ages by Eva Figes
Sans Everything by Barbara Robb
 From "Under the greenwood tree" (II.v):
Under the Greenwood Tree by Thomas Hardy
Under the Greenwood Tree, 1918 film
Under the Greenwood Tree, 1929 film adaptation of Hardy's novel
The Lie Direct by Sara Woods (V.iv)

Coriolanus 

From "O! a kiss / Long as my exile" (V.iii):
The Exile Kiss by George Alec Effinger

Hamlet 

A Little Less Than Kind by Charlotte Armstrong (I.ii)
Less Than Kind, 2008 television series (I.ii)
Too, Too Solid Flesh by Nick O'Donohoe (I.ii)
The Winds of Heaven by Monica Dickens (I.ii)
Infants of the Spring by Anthony Powell (I.iii)
Path of Dalliance by Auberon Waugh (I.iii)
This Above All by Eric Knight (I.iii)
"Thine Own Self", 1994 Star Trek: The Next Generation episode (I.iii)
From "to the manner born" (I.iv):
To the Manor Born, 1979–1981 television series
The Glimpses of the Moon by Edith Wharton (I.iv)
The Glimpses of the Moon by Edmund Crispin (I.iv)
A Pin's Fee by Peter de Polnay (I.iv)
Dreadful Summit by Stanley Ellin (I.iv)
Something Rotten by Jasper Fforde (I.iv)
From "Murder most foul" (I.v):
See Murder Most Foul (disambiguation)
The Celestial Bed by Irving Wallace (I.v)
From "Leave her to heaven" (I.v):
Leave Her to Heaven, 1940 play by John Van Druten
Leave Her to Heaven, 1944 novel by Ben Ames Williams
Leave Her to Heaven, 1945 film of Williams's novel
And Be a Villain by Rex Stout (I.v)
From "There are more things in heaven and earth, Horatio, / Than are dreamt of in your philosophy." (I.v)
"There Are More Things", 1975 short story by Jorge Luis Borges
There Are More Things, 2022 novel by Yara Rodrigues Fowler
More Things in Heaven, 1973 novel by John Brunner
From "The time is out of joint" (I.v):
Time Out of Joint by Philip K. Dick
From "Though this be madness, yet there is method in't" (II.ii):
Method — Or Madness?, 1957 lecture series by Robert Lewis
Method to the Maadness, 2010 album by Kano
Method to the Madness of Jerry Lewis, 2011 documentary film
Her Privates We by Frederic Manning (II.ii); also published as The Middle Parts of Fortune: Somme and Ancre, 1916, referring to the same section of II.ii: "On fortune's cap we are not the very button ... Then you live about her waist, or in the middle of her favours?" 
 From "I could be bounded in a nutshell, and count myself a king of infinite space" (II.ii):
Nutshell, 2016 novel by Ian McEwan
Kings of Infinite Space, 1967 novel by Nigel Balchin
Kings of Infinite Space, 2004 novel by James Hynes
How Like an Angel by Margaret Millar (II.ii)
How Like a God by Brenda Clough (II.ii)
"The Paragon of Animals", 1998 Babylon 5 episode (II.ii)
His Picture in Little, artwork by Tacita Dean (II.ii)
Said to be from "I am but mad north-northwest" (II.ii):
North by Northwest, 1959 film by Alfred Hitchcock

Cue for Passion, play by Elmer Rice (II.ii)
"The Conscience of the King", 1966 Star Trek episode (II.ii)
From the "To be, or not to be" soliloquy (III.i):
See To Be or Not to Be (disambiguation)
Slings & Arrows, 2003 Showcase Original Series
Outrageous Fortune, 1987 film written by Leslie Dixon
Outrageous Fortune, 2005–2010 television series. (Every episode of the series also took its title from a Shakespearean quotation.)
See Perchance to Dream (disambiguation)
See What Dreams May Come (disambiguation)
See Mortal coil (disambiguation)
With a Bare Bodkin by Cyril Hare
The Undiscovered Country, 1991 Star Trek film
No Traveller Returns by John Collier
The Name of Action by Graham Greene
Be All My Sins Remember'd, 2008 Stargate: Atlantis episode
All My Sins Remembered by Joe Haldeman
From "I was the more deceived" (III.i):
The Less Deceived, poem by Philip Larkin
"The Chameleon's Dish", a song from In Visible Silence by Art of Noise (III.ii)
The Mousetrap, 1952 play by Agatha Christie (III.ii)
Poison in Jest by John Dickson Carr (III.ii)
Begin, Murderer by Desmond Cory (III.ii)
"Very Like A Whale", poem by Ogden Nash (III.ii)
Contagion to This World by John Lodwick (III.ii)
Flush As May by P. M. Hubbard (III.iii)
The King of Shreds and Patches, an interactive fiction by Jimmy Maher inspired by H. P. Lovecraft (III.iv)
The Owl Was a Baker's Daughter: Obesity, Anorexia Nervosa, and the Repressed Feminine by Marion Woodman (IV.v)
Goodnight, Sweet Ladies by Shamus Frazer (IV.v)
Single Spies by Alan Bennett (IV.v)
O, How the Wheel Becomes It by Anthony Powell (IV.v)
The Herb of Grace by Elizabeth Goudge (IV.v)
No Wind of Blame by Georgette Heyer (IV.vii)
First Gravedigger by Barbara Paul (V.i)
From "Alas, poor Yorick!" (V.i):
Alas! Poor Yorick!, 1913 film starring Fatty Arbuckle
"Alas, Poor Maling", 1940 short story by Graham Greene
Alas Poor Yagan, 1997 editorial cartoon by Dean Alston
Infinite Jest by David Foster Wallace (V.i)
Infinite Jest, album by We Are The Fury (V.i)
The Quick and the Dead, 1995 film by Sam Raimi (V.i)
From "the rest is silence" (V.ii):
See The Rest Is Silence (disambiguation)
From "Rosencrantz and Guildernstern are dead" (V.ii):
Rosencrantz and Guildenstern Are Dead, 1966 play by Tom Stoppard
Rosencrantz and Guildenstern Are Dead, 1990 film adaptation of Stoppard's play
Rosencrantz and Guildenstern Are Undead, 2009 film by Jordan Galland
Put on By Cunning by Ruth Rendell (V.ii)
Bid the Soldiers Shoot by John Lodwick (V.ii)

Henry IV, Part 1 

Tarry and Be Hanged by Sara Woods (I.ii)
I Know a Trick Worth Two of That by Samuel Holt (pseudonym for Donald E. Westlake) (II.i)
Time Must Have a Stop by Aldous Huxley (V.iv)

Henry IV, Part 2 

Loosely based on "Uneasy lies the head that wears a crown" (III.i):
See Heavy Is the Head (disambiguation) and Heavy Lies the Crown (disambiguation)
Chimes at Midnight, 1965 film by Orson Welles (III.ii)
Chimes at Midnight by Seanan McGuire (III.ii)

Henry V 

One Salt Sea, 2011 novel by Seanan McGuire (I.ii)
So Vile a Sin, 1997 novel by Ben Aaronovitch and Kate Orman (II.iv)
From "Once more unto the breach, dear friends, once more" (III.i):
"Once More unto the Breach", 1998 Star Trek: Deep Space Nine episode
Once More Unto the Breach, 2019 film
Unto the Breach, 2006 novel by John Ringo 
Once More into the Bleach, 1988 album by Debbie Harry and Blondie
From the St Crispin's Day Speech (IV.iii):
Household Words, magazine edited by Charles Dickens
We Few, 2005 novel by David Weber and John Ringo
We Happy Few, 2016 video game

Henry VI, Part 1 

Bring Forth the Body by Simon Raven (II.ii)

Henry VI, Part 2 

The Main Chance, 1969–1975 television series (I.i)

Henry VI, Part 3 

Once Broken Faith by Seanan McGuire (IV.iv)

Henry VIII 

From the alternative title:
All Is True, 2018 film
The Long Divorce by Edmund Crispin (II.i)
A Killing Frost by R. D. Wingfield (III.ii)
The Third Day, The Frost by John Marsden (III.ii)
Ashes of Honor by Seanan McGuire (V.v)

Julius Caesar 

"Beware the Ides of March", song by Colosseum (I.ii)
See also Ides of March (disambiguation)
From "The fault, dear Brutus, is not in our stars, / But in ourselves" (I.ii):
The Fault in Our Stars, 2012 novel by John Green 
Dear Brutus, 1917 play by J. M. Barrie
From "think him as a serpent's egg, / Which, hatched, would, as his kind, grow mischievous" (II.i):
See The Serpent's Egg (disambiguation)
Messengers of Day, 1978 memoir by Anthony Powell (II.i)
This Little Measure, 1964 novel by Sara Woods (III.i)
From "Cry 'Havoc!' and let slip the dogs of war" (III.i; "cry havoc" also appears in Coriolanus, III.i, and King John, II.i):
See Cry havoc (disambiguation) and The Dogs of War (disambiguation)
From the speech "Friends, Romans, countrymen, lend me your ears" (III.ii):
Friends, Voters, Countrymen, 2001 book by Boris Johnson
See also Lend Me Your Ears (disambiguation)
"Not to Praise Him", 2002 episode of The Bill
See also The Evil That Men Do (disambiguation)
"The Hollow Men", 1925 poem by T. S. Eliot (IV.ii)
"There is a Tide", 1968 short story by Larry Niven (IV.iii)
Taken at the Flood, 1948 novel by Agatha Christie (IV.iii; also known as There is a Tide, from the same passage)
On Such a Full Sea, 2014 novel by Chang-Rae Lee (IV.iii)

King John 

 From "To gild refined gold, to paint the lily" (II.ii):
See Gilded Lily (disambiguation)
Twice-Told Tales by Charles Dickens (III.iv)
Twice-Told Tales by Nathaniel Hawthorne (III.iv)
Twice-Told Tales, 1963 film (III.iv)
Twice Told Tales, 2015 album by 10,000 Maniacs
From "Heaven take my soul, and England keep my bones" (IV.iii):
England Have My Bones by T. H. White
England Keep My Bones, 2011 album by Frank Turner

King Lear 

Words of Love by Pearl S. Buck (I.i)
Late Eclipses by Seanan McGuire (I.ii)
If We Were Villains by M. L. Rio (I.ii)
From "How sharper than a serpent’s tooth it is / To have a thankless child" (I.iv):
"How Sharper Than a Serpent's Tooth", 1974 Star Trek animated episode
"The Serpent's Tooth", 2000 My Family episode
"A Father's Curse" by Honoré de Balzac (I.iv)
Faces in My Time by Anthony Powell (II.ii)
From "I am a man / More sinned against than sinning" (III.ii):
"More Spinned Against", short story by John Wyndham
Act of Darkness by Francis King (III.iv.93)
From "Child Rowland to the dark tower came" (III.iv.195):
"Childe Roland to the Dark Tower Came", poem by Robert Browning
See The Dark Tower (disambiguation)
The Lake of Darkness by Ruth Rendell (III.v)
Every Inch a King by Harry Turtledove (IV.vi)
From "the small gilded fly does lecher in my sight" (IV.vi):
The Case of the Gilded Fly by Edmund Crispin
From "I am bound / Upon a wheel of fire, that mine own tears / Do scald like molten lead" (IV.vii):
The Wheel of Fire: Interpretations of Shakespearian Tragedy by G. Wilson Knight
Ripeness is All by Eric Linklater (V.ii)

Full Circle, 1975 novel by Peter Straub (V.iii)
Full Circle, 1984 novel by Danielle Steel (V.iii)
Speak What We Feel (Not What We Ought To Say) by Frederick Buechner (V.iii)

Macbeth 

Wyrd Sisters by Terry Pratchett (I.iii, etc.)
The Seeds of Time by John Wyndham (I.iii)
Mortal Thoughts, 1991 film (I.v)
The Moon Is Down by John Steinbeck (II.i)
The Moon is Down, album by Further Seems Forever (II.i)
Fatal Vision by Joe McGinniss (II.i)
Dagger of the Mind by Bob Shaw (II.i)
Hear not my Steps by L. T. C. Rolt (II.i)
From "Sleep no more'" (II.ii):
See Sleep No More (disambiguation)
From "'tis the eye of childhood / That fears a painted devil." (II.ii):
To Fear a Painted Devil, 1965 novel by Ruth Rendell
A Painted Devil, 1975 novel by Rachel Billington
Wash This Blood Clean from My Hand by Fred Vargas (II.ii)
A Heart So White by Javier Marías (II.ii)
Look to the Lady by Margery Allingham (II.iii)
Light Thickens by Ngaio Marsh (III.ii)
Let It Come Down by Paul Bowles (III.iii)
Can Such Things Be? by Ambrose Bierce (III.iv)
From "Double, double, toil and trouble" (IV.i)
See 
Toil and Trouble, volume 2 title of the comic book series X-Men Blue
Fire, Burn! by John Dickson Carr (IV.i)
Fire Burn and Cauldron Bubble by H. P. Mallory (IV.i)
A Charm of Powerful Trouble by Joanne Horniman (IV.i)
By the Pricking of My Thumbs by Agatha Christie (IV.i)
From "Something wicked this way comes" (IV.i):
See Something Wicked (disambiguation) and Something Wicked This Way Comes (disambiguation)
From "until / Great Birnam wood to high Dunsinane hill / Shall come" (IV.i, with variations thereafter)
"When Birnam Wood" by Larry Niven (chapter from The Integral Trees)
"The Birnam Wood", The West Wing Season 6 episode
Come Like Shadows by Simon Raven (IV.i)
The Brightest Fell by Seanan McGuire (IV.iii)
A Rooted Sorrow by P. M. Hubbard (V.iii)
Taste of Fears by Margaret Millar (V.v)
From the "Tomorrow and tomorrow and tomorrow" soliloquy (V.v; including "all our yesterdays have lighted fools the way to dusty death", "Out, out, brief candle!", "Life's but a walking shadow, a poor player that struts and frets his hour upon the stage" and "It is a tale told by an idiot, full of sound and fury, signifying nothing"):
See

Measure for Measure 

Mortality and Mercy in Vienna by Thomas Pynchon (I.i)
A Thirsty Evil by P. M. Hubbard (I.ii)
Another Thing to Fall by Laura Lippman (II.i)
Measure for Murder by Clifford Witting (III.i)

The Merchant of Venice 

From the title:
The Merchants of Venus, 1972 novella by Frederik Pohl
Merchants of Venus, 1998 film
The Serpent of Venice, 2014 book by Christopher Moore
Villain with a Smiling Cheek, 1948 book by Paul Murray (I.iii)
 From "pound of flesh" (III.iii et passim):
See Pound of Flesh (disambiguation)
Perhaps from "All that glisters is not gold" (II.vii):
See All That Glitters (disambiguation)
Perhaps from "between you and I" (III.ii):
Between You and I: A Little Book of Bad English, 2003 book by James Cochrane
"Between You & I", 2006 song by Jessica Simpson
"Between You & I", 2019 song by Kita Alexander
From "The quality of mercy is not strained" (IV.i):
See The Quality of Mercy (disambiguation)
From "So shines a good deed in a naughty world" (V.i):
"A Goon's Deed in a Weary World", 2013 30 Rock episode

A Midsummer Night's Dream 

From the title:
See A Midsummer Night's Dream (disambiguation)
Ill Met by Moonlight, 1950 book by W. Stanley Moss (II.i)
Ill Met by Moonlight, 1957 film adaptation of Moss's book, by Michael Powell and Emeric Pressburger (II.i)
Ill Met by Moonlight, 1994 film by S. P. Somtow (II.i)
"Ill Met by Moonlight", 1996 episode of Gargoyles (II.i)
Night and Silence by Seanan McGuire (II.ii)
Bottom's Dream by Arno Schmidt (IV.i)
A Local Habitation by Seanan McGuire (V.i)

Much Ado About Nothing 

From the title:
See Much Ado About Nothing (disambiguation)
From "Sigh no more" (II.iii):
See Sigh No More (disambiguation)
Kill Claudio by P. M. Hubbard (IV.i)

Othello 

From "the beast with two backs" (I.i):
See 
From "passing strange" (I.iii):
See Passing Strange (disambiguation)
Nothing if Not Critical by Robert Hughes (II.i)
From "Pride, pomp, and circumstance of glorious war!" (III.iii):
Pomp and Circumstance Marches, orchestral marches by Edward Elgar
Pomp and Circumstance, novel by Noël Coward
From "mortal engines" (III.iii):
See Mortal Engines (disambiguation)
From "journey's end" (V.ii – but cf. also Twelfth Night, II.iii):
See Journey's End (disambiguation)
Richer Than All His Tribe by Nicholas Monsarrat (V.ii)

Pericles, Prince of Tyre 

Behold, Here's Poison by Georgette Heyer (I.i)

Richard II 

This Sceptred Isle, 1995 radio series on British history
The Demi-Paradise, 1943 film with Laurence Olivier (II.i)
This Happy Breed, 1939 play by Noël Coward (II.i)
This Happy Breed, 1944 film directed by David Lean, based on Coward's play (II.i)
This Blessed Plot by Hugo Young (II.i)

Bid Time Return by Richard Matheson (III.ii)
From "the hollow crown" (III.ii):
See The Hollow Crown (disambiguation)
Who Are the Violets Now? by Auberon Waugh (V.ii)

Richard III 

From "Now is the winter of our discontent" (I.i):
See Winter of Discontent (disambiguation)
From "where eagles dare" (I.iii):
See Where Eagles Dare (disambiguation)
Tomorrow in the Battle Think on Me by Javier Marías (V.iii)
From "A horse, a horse, my kingdom for a horse!" (V.iv):
My Kingdom for a Cook, 1943 film
My Kingdom for a Horse, 1988 BBC TV series starring Sean Bean

Romeo and Juliet 

An Artificial Night by Seanan McGuire (I.i)
The Strangers All Are Gone by Anthony Powell (I.v)
Deny Thy Father by Jeff Mariotte (II.ii)
From "What's in a name? That which we call a rose / By any other word would smell as sweet" (II.ii):
See What's in a Name? (disambiguation)
"By Any Other Name", 1968 Star Trek episode
A Rose by Any Other Name, 1975 album by Ronnie Milsap
Inconstant Moon by Larry Niven (II.ii)
Too Like the Lightning by Ada Palmer (II.ii)
"Such Sweet Sorrow", ER episode (II.ii)
Not So Deep as a Well, poem by Dorothy Parker (III.i)
Both Your Houses, play by Maxwell Anderson (III.i)
It Was the Nightingale by Ford Madox Ford (III.v)

The Sonnets 

The Darling Buds of May by H. E. Bates (XVIII)
The Darling Buds of May, TV comedy based on H. E. Bates's novel (XVIII)
Summer's Lease by John Mortimer (XVIII)
From "fortune and men's eyes" (XXIX):
Fortune and Men's Eyes, 1967 play by John Herbert

Fortune and Men's Eyes, 1971 film adaptation of John Herbert's play
Fortune and Men's Eyes, 1987 album by Jennifer Caron Hall
Remembrance of Things Past by Marcel Proust (only in English translation; XXX)
The Pebbled Shore by Elizabeth Longford (LX)
Where Late the Sweet Birds Sang by Kate Wilhelm (LXXIII)
Absent in the Spring by Agatha Christie (XCVIII)
Chronicles of Wasted Time by Malcolm Muggeridge (CVI)
Nothing Like the Sun by Anthony Burgess (CXXX)
...Nothing Like the Sun, album by Sting (CXXX)
A Waste of Shame, 2005 drama (CXXIX)
Too Dear for My Possessing by Pamela Hansford Johnson (CXXXVII)
No More Dying Then by Ruth Rendell (CXLVI)

The Taming of the Shrew 

Kiss Me, Kate, play by Cole Porter (V.i)
Kiss Me Kate, 1953 film of Cole Porter's musical (V.i)
 Kiss Me Kate, 2009 EP by Kate Tsui (V.i)
Kiss Me Kate, 1998–2000 BBC sitcom (V.i)

The Tempest 

Hell Is Empty and All the Devils Are Here, album by Anaal Nathrakh (I.ii)
Hag-Seed by Margaret Atwood (I.ii)
From Ariel's Song (I.ii):
Come Unto These Yellow Sands, painting by Richard Dadd
See Full Fathom Five (disambiguation) and Sea change (disambiguation)
"Pearls That Were", poem by J. H. Prynne
Something Rich and Strange, 1994 novel by Patricia A. McKillip
Rich and Strange, 1931 film by Alfred Hitchcock
The Isle Is Full of Noises, play by Derek Walcott (III.ii)
Into Thin Air by Jon Krakauer (IV.i)
Such Stuff As Screams Are Made Of by Robert Bloch (from "We are such stuff / As dreams are made on", IV.i)
This Rough Magic by Mary Stewart (V.i)
Rough Magic, 1995 film with Russell Crowe and Bridget Fonda (V.i)
Where the Bee Sucks, poetry anthology by Iolo Aneurin Williams (V.i)
Brave New World by Aldous Huxley (V.i)
Every Third Thought by John Barth (V.i)

Timon of Athens 

In Cold Blood by Truman Capote (III.v)
Fools of Fortune by William Trevor (III.vi)
Fools of Fortune, 1990 film of William Trevor's novel (III.vi)
Pale Fire by Vladimir Nabokov (IV.iii)

Titus Andronicus 

Gentle People by Irwin Shaw (V.iii)

Troilus and Cressida 

Good Riddance, 1979 film (II.i)
"Good Riddance (Time of Your Life)", song by Green Day (II.i)
Alms for Oblivion, series of novels by Simon Raven (III.iii) 

Not the Glory by Pierre Boulle (IV.i)

Twelfth Night 

Present Laughter, play by Noël Coward (II.iii)
Cakes and Ale by Somerset Maugham (II.iii)
Sad Cypress by Agatha Christie (II.iv)
To Play the Fool by Laurie R. King (III.i)
Improbable Fiction, play by Alan Ayckbourn (III.iv)

The Two Gentlemen of Verona 

The Unkindest Tide by Seanan McGuire (II.iii)

The Winter's Tale 

There Was A Man Dwelt by a Churchyard, short story by M. R. James (from "There was a man ... Dwelt by a churchyard", II.i)
He Drank, and Saw the Spider by Alex Bledsoe (from "I have drunk, and seen the spider", II.i)
Fresh Horses, 1988 film by David Anspaugh (III.i)

Exit, Pursued by a Bear by E. K. Johnston (stage direction in III.iii)
Rosemary and Rue by Seanan McGuire (IV.iv)
The Winter Long by Seanan McGuire (IV.iv)

Other 
The Passionate Pilgrim, 1984 film with Eric Morecambe (from The Passionate Pilgrim, the title of a 16th-century anthology attributed to Shakespeare)
A Red Rose Chain by Seanan McGuire, from Venus and Adonis

See also 
 List of book titles taken from literature

References

External links 
A more comprehensive list of book and play titles which are Shakespearean quotations

Shakespeare
Shakespeare, List of titles of works